1000-Word Philosophy is an online philosophy anthology that publishes introductory 1000-word (or less) essays on philosophical topics.
The project was created in 2014 by Andrew D. Chapman, a philosophy lecturer at the University of Colorado, Boulder. Since 2018, the blog's editor-in-chief is Nathan Nobis, an associate professor of philosophy at Morehouse College. Many of the initial authors are graduates of the University of Colorado at Boulder's Ph.D. program in philosophy; now the contributors are from all over the globe. The essays include references or sources for more discussion of the essay's topic.

See also
The Stone (blog)

References

External links
 1000-Word Philosophy
 1000-Word Philosophy on Facebook
 1000-Word Philosophy on Twitter

Philosophy blogs
University of Colorado Boulder
American blogs
Philosophy education
2014 establishments in the United States
American educational websites